Patrick James Rothfuss (born June 6, 1973) is an American author. He is best known for his unfinished trilogy The Kingkiller Chronicle, which has won him several awards, including the 2007 Quill Award for his debut novel, The Name of the Wind. Its sequel, The Wise Man's Fear, topped The New York Times Best Seller list.

Early life 
Patrick Rothfuss was born in Madison, Wisconsin, and received his B.A. in English from the University of Wisconsin–Stevens Point in 1999. He contributed to The Pointer, the campus paper, and produced a widely circulated parody warning about the Goodtimes Virus. He taught part-time at Stevens Point. In 2002, he received a master's degree in arts and English from Washington State University. He won the Writers of the Future 2002 Second Quarter competition with "The Road to Levenshir", an excerpt from his then-unpublished novel The Wise Man's Fear.

Career

Writing 
In 2006, Rothfuss sold his novel The Name of the Wind to DAW Books, which was released in 2007. It won a Quill Award (for Science Fiction, Fantasy and Horror) and was listed among Publishers Weeklys Books of the Year. It also won an Alex Award in 2008. An illustrated tenth anniversary edition was published in 2017. Its sequel, The Wise Man's Fear, was published in March 2011 and reached No. 1 on the New York Times Hardback Fiction Best Seller List.

The Slow Regard of Silent Things, an illustrated novella, was published in October 2014 as a companion story for The Kingkiller Chronicle, centering on the character Auri.

Rothfuss has also released two stories set in the same world as The Kingkiller Chronicle in anthologies. The first was "How Old Holly Came To Be", published in Unfettered in June 2013. The second was the novella The Lightning Tree, released in Rogues in June 2014, featuring the character Bast. The whole anthology was nominated for the 2015 World Fantasy Award for Best Anthology.

In 2018, Rothfuss was the co-writer of the comics limited series Rick and Morty vs. Dungeons & Dragons #1-4 with Jim Zub and with art by Troy Little. The crossover, between the adult animated sitcom Rick and Morty comic book and Dungeons & Dragons, was published by IDW Publishing and Oni Press. The Rick and Morty vs Dungeons and Dragons Deluxe Edition, by Rothfuss, Zub, and Little, was nominated for the 2022 "Best Graphic Album—Reprint" Eisner Award.

In July 2020, Rothfuss's editor and publisher Betsy Wollheim responded publicly on her Facebook account to an article speculating on reasons why The Doors of Stone, the concluding volume of the trilogy, had not been published, saying she had "never seen a word of book three" and that she didn't think Rothfuss had written anything since 2014. The post has since been deleted.

In December 2021, Rothfuss partnered with Grim Oak Press to create a new imprint called Underthing Press. The new imprint's first project will be a reprint of Ursula Vernon's webcomic Digger, which won the Hugo Award in 2012. Rothfuss stated that he'd always daydreamed of starting his own imprint and he decided to create Underthing Press when he realized he couldn't buy a new copy of Digger Omnibus after giving his copy to a friend.

In December 2021, Rothfuss tweeted that he would "[s]hare a full chapter of Doors of Stone" if his charity reached a $333,333 fundraising goal. The goal was reached "unbelievably quickly by readers hungry for more Kingkiller content," yet as of March 2023, no chapter has been released.

Charity 
Rothfuss founded the charity Worldbuilders in 2008. Since its inception, the organization has raised over $11.5 million, primarily for Heifer International, a charity that provides livestock, clean water, education, and training for communities in the developing world. By 2020, Worldbuilders had raised over $10 million in support of Heifer.

Podcasts 
In August 2012, Rothfuss began a monthly podcast, The Story Board, on fantasy, featuring authors such as Terry Brooks and Brandon Sanderson. The Story Board ran for eight episodes.

In June 2015, he and Max Temkin started a podcast, Unattended Consequences, then named Untitled Patrick Rothfuss. The podcast concluded in 2018.

Rothfuss has appeared several times on the podcast Writing Excuses.

In June 2020, Rothfuss, in partnership with One Shot Podcast, released a mini-series which is set in the same world as his KingKiller Chronicles fantasy series.

Roleplaying and games 
In 2014, Rothfuss began collaborating with James Ernest to create an abstract strategy game called Tak based on the game featured in his book The Wise Man's Fear.

Rothfuss has played a character named Viari in the Penny Arcade's live Dungeons & Dragons games known as Acquisitions Inc. from Season 7 onward, as well as a guest role in its spin-off show "The 'C' Team". He also role-played as guest character Kerrek in Geek and Sundry's show Critical Role Campaign One Episode 56, "Hope," and again in Episodes 81–84. He also recorded a letter his character wrote which was heard in Campaign One Episode 69, "Passed Through Fire".

Rothfuss was a guest on Wil Wheaton's Tabletop, playing Lords of Waterdeep on Episode 10 of Season 2, which he won.

He was a member of the Story Design team for inXile's Torment: Tides of Numenera game.

Works

The Kingkiller Chronicle 

The Name of the Wind (2007)
The Wise Man's Fear (2011)
 "How Old Holly Came To Be" – short story. (July 2013, Grim Oak Press), Unfettered, edited by Shawn Speakman. 
 The Lightning Tree – novella. (June 2014, Bantam) Rogues, edited by George R. R. Martin and Gardner Dozois. 
 The Slow Regard of Silent Things (October 2014, DAW Books).

The Adventures of the Princess and Mr. Whiffle 
The Thing Beneath the Bed (2010)
The Dark of Deep Below (2013)

Others 

Your Annotated, Illustrated College Survival Guide (January 2005, Cornerstone Press).
Rick and Morty vs. Dungeons & Dragons (w/ Jim Zub and Troy Little, 4 issues August 2018-January 2019, tpb March 2019, IDW Publishing).

Awards and honors 
Writers of the Future (2002 Second Quarter)
Quill Award (2007)
"Best Books of the Year" (2007) – Publishers Weekly – Science Fiction/Fantasy/Horror
 Romantic Times Reviewers' Choice Award for Best Epic Fantasy (2007)
NPR Top 100 Science-Fiction, Fantasy Books (2011)
"David Gemmell Legend Award" (2012)
Ranked 3rd in "Best 21st Century Fantasy Fiction Novels" by Locus (2012)

References

External links 

 
 
 
 Adria's News Interview (Summer 2014)
 Patrick Rothfuss interview (Autumn 2015)
 
 

1973 births
21st-century American novelists
21st-century American short story writers
American fantasy writers
American male novelists
American male short story writers
Living people
University of Wisconsin–Stevens Point alumni
21st-century American male writers
Writers from Madison, Wisconsin
Washington State University alumni